The Green Line is a Bay Area Rapid Transit (BART) line in the San Francisco Bay Area that runs from Berryessa/North San José station to Daly City station. It has 22 stations in San Jose, Milpitas, Fremont, Union City, Hayward, San Leandro, Oakland, San Francisco, and Daly City. The line shares tracks with the four other primary BART services.

As of February 14, 2022, the line runs until 9 pm every day. At other times, service along the route is provided by the Orange Line and the Blue Line, with timed transfers at Bay Fair station.

History 
The Green Line was the third of BART's five rapid transit lines to open. Transbay service began when the Transbay Tube opened on September 16, 1974, connecting the Montgomery Street–Daly City section (opened November 5, 1973) with the East Bay sections of the system. Initial Transbay service was two lines: the Yellow Line and the Green Line. The extension to Warm Springs/South Fremont station opened on March 25, 2017. Until September 10, 2018, Saturday service on the line only ran to Fremont station.

A second extension to Berryessa/North San José station as part of the Silicon Valley extension project opened on June 13, 2020. The full extension is planned to eventually reach 28th Street/Little Portugal, Downtown San Jose, Diridon, and Santa Clara stations in 2029 or 2030.

Stations

References 

Green Line (BART)
Railway lines opened in 1974
1974 establishments in California